One Born Every Minute Australia is an Australian observational docuseries that follows the births of expecting families as they prepare for labour at Sydney’s Westmead Hospital. The show, an Australian version of the UK show by the same name, was produced by Endemol Shine Australia and aired via Network 10. The show was first aired on 22 October 2019 and concluded its first season on 10 December 2019. The show consists of one season of eight episodes, with each episode having an average duration of 49 minutes. Over an eight-week period the series was filmed in Sydney’s Westmead Hospital Birthing Unit, where over 5,500 families choose to birth their babies each year. The series follows the birthing journeys of multiple women as they enter into labour, proceed into giving birth and welcome newborn babies. The show was nominated for the ASE (Australian Screen Editors) Award for Best Editing in Factual Entertainment in 2020.

Content and plot 

Each episode of One Born Every Minute follows a series of unrelated women and families entering Westmead Hospital to give birth. Each episode generally follows three to four families who enter the hospital while in labour. While in labour, families and doctors discuss many birth-related topics, such as birthing options and any potential birthing complications. Some background information is provided on the birth parents, as well as an overview of any previous and present pregnancies. After the mothers give birth, the series introduces the newly born child along with any other relevant post-birth information.

The series explores many aspects and themes of childbirth. Moderate birthing complications such as breech births and caesarean sections are common themes within the show. Additionally, more serious themes such as congenital birth defects, heart problems and pre and post-natal birth complications are present.

Production and production history 
One Born Every Minute Australia premiered on 22 October 2019. The show only has one season with eight episodes, with the final episode airing on 10 December 2019. The show was produced under Australian media company Endemol Shine Australia and broadcast via Network 10 (an Australian free-to-air commercial television network). Beverley McGarvey, chief content officer for Network 10 stated, "We have seen our audiences really embrace and enjoy an insight into the world of genuinely amazing Australians including paramedics and life-guards, so having the opportunity to now get close to the incredible and dedicated teams who help us through childbirth is not only thrilling but is a real privilege and a series we believe will be very special."

The show is narrated by Jane Hall and directed and produced by Michael Bennett, along with producers Debbie Cuell and Sarah Thornton. The series was edited by Karen Crespo. The show used footage from over 60 fixed rig cameras set up around Westmead Hospital Birthing Unit, with the aim to capture the realities of parenthood, nurses, hospital culture and relationships. One Born Every Minute Australia is the Australian version of the UK series One Born Every Minute. The original UK series was sold to several countries, where an Australian and American version of the same name, One Born Every Minute, exists.

Audience reception 
One Born Every Minute Australia has had an overall positive response from audiences, with 97% of Google users liking the show. The show also received positive coverage from multiple Australian media outlets, such as the Sydney Morning Herald and Hit Network. The premiering episode of the series received 325,000 metro viewers, with the series receiving 454,000 national views altogether.

Episode list

References

External links 
 
 
 Endemol Shine Australia

2010s Australian reality television series
2019 Australian television series debuts
Network 10 original programming
2010s Australian medical television series
Australian factual television series
Australian workplace television series
Television series by Endemol Australia
Television shows set in Sydney
English-language television shows
Pregnancy-themed television shows
Australian television series based on British television series